Beniabid (also Romanized as Benīābīd; also known as Benābīd) is a village in Dughayi Rural District, in the Central District of Quchan County, Razavi Khorasan Province, Iran. At the 2006 census, its population was 564, in 114 families.

References 

Populated places in Quchan County